The Little Sisters of the Poor Home for the Aged is a building in northeast Minneapolis, Minnesota, United States, built by a charitable organization, the Little Sisters of the Poor.  They came to Minneapolis in 1889 to build a home for the aged.  Architect Frederick Corser designed the first part of the building in 1895, consisting of a -story building with an attached chapel.  Corser's design was based more on its scale and proportion than on its ornamentation.

The home needed more space, so in 1905 Corser designed an east wing of the structure, following the original design principles. In 1914 still more space was added in a west wing, this time designed by Frederick Kees and Serenus Colburn, but following the same design.  The Sisters and their patients later moved in 1977 to a new building in Saint Paul.  The old building, on Broadway Street Northeast between Second and Third Avenues, was renovated into a 71-unit apartment complex. It was listed on the National Register of Historic Places in 1978.

References

Buildings and structures in Minneapolis
National Register of Historic Places in Minneapolis
Residential buildings completed in 1895
Residential buildings completed in 1905
Residential buildings completed in 1914
Residential buildings on the National Register of Historic Places in Minnesota
1905 establishments in Minnesota